Joydeep Mukherjee (born 5 February 1967) is an Indian former first-class cricketer who played for Bengal. He took up various coaching roles after his playing career.

Career
Mukherjee was a right-handed batsman and occasional right-arm off break bowler. He appeared in 13 first-class and 6 List A matches, playing for Bengal and East Zone. He played for Bengal between 1987/88 and 1994/95 seasons.

Mukherjee became the cricket manager of the Indian Premier League team Kolkata Knight Riders in 2008 and remains with the franchise as a coaching staff as of 2015. As of February 2016, Mukherjee was the fielding coach of Bengal, head coach of the Bengal u-25 team, has also served as the Asst Coach of the senior Bengal Team. Since, 2018 he has been the Director - Cricket Operations at The Cricket Association Of Bengal. having previously worked as head coach of Bengal age-group teams. He also works as a television commentator. He is the son of the renowned Bengali film actor and director Dilip Mukherjee.

References

External links 
 
 

1967 births
Living people
Indian cricketers
Bengal cricketers
East Zone cricketers
Indian cricket coaches